Dolly Davis (30 October 1896 – 3 November 1962) was a French film actress.

Born Julienne Alexandrine David in Paris, Davis died in Neuilly-sur-Seine.

Selected filmography
 Hantise (1922)
 Geneviève (1923)
 Paris (1924)
 The Imaginary Voyage (1926)
 Mademoiselle Josette, My Woman (1926)
 The Chocolate Girl (1927)
 Le chauffeur de Mademoiselle (1927)
 Café Elektric (1927)
 Tingel-Tangel (1927)
 Dolly (1928)
 Orient (1928)
 Misled Youth  (1929)
 My Daughter's Tutor (1929)
 The Wonderful Day (1929)
 The White Roses of Ravensberg (1929)
 A Hole in the Wall (1930)
 Shadows of Paris (1932)
 Un Train dans La Nuit (1934)
 Southern Bar (1938)

Bibliography
 Powrie, Phil & Rebillard, Éric. Pierre Batcheff and stardom in 1920s French cinema. Edinburgh University Press, 2009

External links

Dolly Davis at Virtual History

1896 births
1962 deaths
French film actresses
French silent film actresses
Actresses from Paris
20th-century French actresses